Israr Ahmed (born 2 May 1999) is a Pakistani cricketer. He made his first-class debut for Karachi Whites in the 2018–19 Quaid-e-Azam Trophy on 16 September 2018. He made his List A debut for Karachi Whites in the 2018–19 Quaid-e-Azam One Day Cup on 30 September 2018.

References

External links
 

1999 births
Living people
Pakistani cricketers
Karachi Whites cricketers